Gloeococcus is a genus of green algae in the family Palmellopsidaceae.

Species
, AlgaeBase accepted the following species:
Gloeococcus alsius (Skuja) Fott
Gloeococcus braunii J.W.G.Lund
Gloeococcus grevillei (C.Agardh) Shuttleworth
Gloeococcus lateralis M.O.P.Iyengar
Gloeococcus minor A.Braun
Gloeococcus minutissimus J.M.King
Gloeococcus mucosus A.Braun
Gloeococcus pyriformis M.O.P.Iyengar
Gloeococcus simplex M.O.P.Iyengar
Gloeococcus tetrasporus Kugrens

References

External links

Scientific references

Scientific databases
 AlgaTerra database
 Index Nominum Genericorum

Chlamydomonadales
Chlamydomonadales genera